Lunik Point is an ice-covered coastal point, lying  northeast of Mount Dergach on the west side of Ob' Bay, Antarctica. It was photographed and plotted by the Soviet Antarctic Expedition, 1958, and named after "Lunik", the first Soviet moon module.

References

Headlands of Victoria Land
Pennell Coast